Diadegma acronyctae is a wasp first described by William Harris Ashmead in 1896. No subspecies are listed.

References

acronyctae
Insects described in 1896